Yin C. Paradies  is Alfred Deakin Professor and Chair in Race Relations at Deakin University. He is a Wakaya (Aboriginal) man known for his research on the health and societal effects of racism, as well as his work on applying anti-racism principles in a wide variety of settings. He also teaches and undertakes research in Indigenous knowledges and decolonisation. In 2007, he received the NAIDOC Scholar of the Year Award. Paradies was elected Fellow of the Academy of the Social Sciences in Australia in November 2021.

References

External links
Deakin University profile 
LinkedIn
YouTube

Living people
Academic staff of Deakin University
Australian public health doctors
University of Newcastle (Australia) alumni
University of California, Berkeley alumni
University of Melbourne alumni
Charles Darwin University alumni
Year of birth missing (living people)
Fellows of the Academy of the Social Sciences in Australia